| attendance ={{#expr:

 + 3341 + 200 + 7000 + 5455 + 9000 + 4067
 + 500 + 0 + 3025 + 9050 + 0 + 0 + 5000 + 1000
 + 5000 + 9000 + 1000 + 5000 + 7000 + 1000
 + 750 + 0 + 5000 + 14000 + 7000 + 7500
 + 3200 + 7000 + 800 + 5737 + 6108 + 6000
 + 1000 + 4000 + 4000 + 4121 + 5071 + 9000 + 5000 + 9000
 + 9000 + 6431 + 28000 + 11300
 + 10525 + 13368
 + 51431
}}
| matches = 41
| highest attendance  = 51,431 - Lyon v Toulon 27 May 2022
| lowest attendance   = 200 - Zebre v Biarritz 11 December 2021
| top point scorer =  Léo Berdeu (Lyon)71 points
| top try scorer =  Santiago Socino (Gloucester)5 tries
| venue = Stade Vélodrome, Marseille
| attendance
| website = EPCR Website
| previous tournament = 2020–21 European Rugby Challenge Cup
| previous year = 2020–21
| next tournament = 2022–23 European Rugby Challenge Cup
| next year = 2022–23
}}
The 2021–22 EPCR Challenge Cup was the eighth edition of the EPCR Challenge Cup, an annual second-tier rugby union competition for professional clubs. Including the predecessor competition, the original European Challenge Cup, this was the 26th edition of European club rugby's second-tier competition.

Due to the COVID-19 pandemic, the tournament format was changed for the previous season. A similar format remained for this season, however, the number of teams was increased from 14 to 15 and an additional six will join from the Champions Cup.

The tournament commenced in December 2021, and concluded with the final on 27 May 2022 at Stade Vélodrome in Marseille, France.

Lyon, who are in their first European final, won the Challenge Cup by defeating Toulon making it their first European title. It is also their first major title since their Champion de France title in 1933.

Teams
Fifteen teams qualified for the 2021–22 EPCR Cup from Premiership Rugby, the Top 14 and the United Rugby Championship as a direct result of their domestic league performance having not qualified for the Heineken Champions Cup.

The distribution of teams are:

 England: five teams
 Any teams finishing between 9th and 12th position in the Premiership that do not qualify for the 2020–21 European Champions Cup
 The champion of the Championship (Saracens)
 France: six teams
 Any teams finishing between 9th and 12th position in the Top 14 that do not qualify for the 2020–21 European Champions Cup
 As defending champions Montpellier did not finish in the top 8, the 8th ranked team will also compete in the Challenge Cup
 The champion of the Pro D2 (Perpignan)
 The winner of the relegation playoff between the 13th placed team in the Top 14 and the runner-up of the Pro D2 (Biarritz)
 Ireland, Italy, Scotland, Wales: four teams
 The bottom two sides in each conference from the Pro14

Team details

Pool stage

Pool A

Pool B

Pool C

Knock Out Stage

Seeding for knockout stage

Bracket

Round of 16

Quarter-finals

Semi-finals

Final

See also
 2021–22 European Rugby Champions Cup

Notes

References

 
European Rugby Challenge Cup
European Rugby Challenge Cup
European Rugby Challenge Cup
European Rugby Challenge Cup
European Rugby Challenge Cup
European Rugby Challenge Cup
European Rugby Challenge Cup
EPCR Challenge Cup seasons